Mount Grant is a  mountain summit located in the Canadian Cascades of southwestern British Columbia, Canada. The peak was first climbed June 15, 1951, by Paul Binkert, John Booth, Dick Chambers, Jim Irving, Don Montgomery, and Jim Teevan. The peak was named for Captain John M. Grant of the Royal Engineers by Fred Beckey in his Cascade Alpine Guide. Precipitation runoff from the peak drains into tributaries of the Fraser River.

Geology

Mount Grant is related to the Chilliwack batholith, which intruded the region 26 to 29 million years ago after the major orogenic episodes in the region. This is part of the Pemberton Volcanic Belt, an eroded volcanic belt that formed as a result of subduction of the Farallon Plate starting 29 million years ago. 

During the Pleistocene period dating back over two million years ago, glaciation advancing and retreating repeatedly scoured the landscape leaving deposits of rock debris. The "U"-shaped cross section of the river valleys are a result of recent glaciation. Uplift and faulting in combination with glaciation have been the dominant processes which have created the tall peaks and deep valleys of the North Cascades area.

The North Cascades features some of the most rugged topography in the Cascade Range with craggy peaks and ridges, deep glacial valleys, and granite spires. Geological events occurring many years ago created the diverse topography and drastic elevation changes over the Cascade Range leading to various climate differences which lead to vegetation variety defining the ecoregions in this area.

Climate

Based on the Köppen climate classification, Mount Grant is located in the marine west coast climate zone of western North America. Most weather fronts originate in the Pacific Ocean, and travel east toward the Cascade Range where they are forced upward by the range (Orographic lift), causing them to drop their moisture in the form of rain or snowfall. As a result, the Cascade Mountains experience high precipitation, especially during the winter months in the form of snowfall. Temperatures can drop below −20 °C with wind chill factors below −30 °C. The months July through September offer the most favorable weather for climbing Mount Grant.

See also

 Geography of the North Cascades

References

External links
 Weather: Mountain Forecast
 Climbing Mount Grant: YouTube
 Mount Grant aerial photo: PBase

Two-thousanders of British Columbia
Canadian Cascades
Cascade Range
North Cascades